Michael Craven is a former American football coach. He was the head football coach at Saint Xavier University in Chicago, Illinois for six seasons, from 1993 until 1998, compiling a record of 8–51.

References

Year of birth missing (living people)
Living people
Saint Xavier Cougars football coaches